Rutilograptis cornesi is a species of moth of the family Tortricidae. It is found in Nigeria.

The ground colour of the forewings is whitish cream, the costa more yellowish spotted with ochreous brown, and so suffused in the distal third. There is a cream blotch densely scaled with brown from the middle of the termen and another similar blotch marked with brown anteriorly extending from the tornus. There is grey suffusion in the whole dorsal part of the wing terminating in its middle area. There is an orange pattern between the largest costal spot and the tornal blotch, accompanied by two streaks and a group of shorter margins in the basal half of the wing. The hindwings are yellowish cream, mixed with brown in the anal area.

References

Endemic fauna of Nigeria
Moths described in 1981
Tortricini